Red Sister is a 2017 fantasy novel by Mark Lawrence. Nona Grey is a young girl who trains at a convent for future assassins. Red Sister is the first novel in the Book of the Ancestor trilogy. The novel was nominated for the 2018 David Gemmell Awards for Fantasy.

Plot
The planet Abeth was originally settled by four tribes with various abilities. The hunska have superhuman speed; the gerant have superhuman strength, the marjal can work elemental magic; the quantal can work larger magics. Children born on Abeth may have access to one (or rarely, multiple) bloodline powers. Abeth’s dying red giant sun cannot generate sufficient heat to prevent a global ice age. Abeth’s man-made moon refracts sunlight onto a narrow strip of land circling the globe. This Corridor, only fifty miles wide, is the only unfrozen land on the planet. It comprises several kingdoms fighting for control of the planet’s resources.

Nona Grey is a peasant girl living in a remote village in the Corridor. She is purchased by a slave trader who recognizes that she has hunska blood. She is brought to the capital of the Empire, where she attacks a noble named Raymel Tacsis. She is saved from execution by Abbess Glass of the Sweet Mercy Convent.

Nona trains in the arts of combat and subterfuge at Sweet Mercy. Along the way, she meets fellow novice Arabella (Ara). Various nobles believe that Ara is the Argatha, a savior destined to save Abeth. Abbess Glass convinces the nobility that Nona is the Shield, destined to protect the Argatha. With her training, Nona recognizes that she also has quantal and marjal talents. Nona also meets a mysterious student named Zole and her bodyguard Yisht. Nona realizes that Yisht is attempting to steal a valuable artifact from Sweet Mercy: the shipheart, which was left by the original settlers of Abeth. With four shiphearts, one can control the moon which is protecting Abeth from a permanent ice age. Nona and the other students defeat Yisht and save the shipheart.

In a frame story, an adult Nona and Ara are attacked by members of the Empire’s nobility. They are betrayed by Clera, a former student at Sweet Mercy. Nona attempts to convince Clera to join them against the Empire’s army.

Style
Writing for Den of Geek, Bridget LaMonica praises Lawrence's subversion of standard fantasy novel tropes. Nona is not presented as a "Chosen One". The story is told in a close third person narrative with an unreliable narrator.

Background
The Book of the Ancestor is Lawrence's first series featuring a female protagonist. It is unconnected from his previous works. Lawrence believes that reading the Malory Towers series by Enid Blyton with his daughter inspired him to focus on an all-female school setting. He also credits various fantasy novels such as The Name of the Wind, A Wizard of Earthsea, and Ender's Game as inspirations for the novel.

Reception
Writing for Tor.com, Laura M. Hughes declared that Red Sister was an improvement from Lawrence's previous works. She praised the book's multiple timelines, writing style, and all-female cast. Publishers Weekly praised the novel's "evocative prose" and "three-dimensional characterizations". Writing for Library Journal, Kristi Chadwick wrote that Red Sister contained a "fantastic world in which religion and politics are dark and sharp as swords". She compared the novel positively to the works of author George R.R. Martin. In her review for the Sydney Mechanics' School of Arts, Melanie Ryan categorizes the novel as grimdark and praises the "exquisitely crafted" world, plot, and characters.

The novel was nominated for the 2018 David Gemmell Awards for Fantasy.

References

2017 fantasy novels
Frame stories
Novels set on fictional planets
Nuns in fiction
HarperCollins books
Ace Books books